FS (real name Fred Sargolini) is an American dubstep producer and DJ from New York City. He is the founding owner of Patriarch Recordings, a record label and creative agency, for which he produces independent artists and scores music for TV and film. In 2011 he released the Touch O Klass EP on Play Me Records, and both "Yup" and "Touch O Klass" reached #1 on the Beatport Top 100 Dubstep Chart. As part of Ming + FS, he broke ground with Hell's Kitchen, and continued to release four, full-length albums and over thirty 12" singles and remixes for Om Records, Spun Records and Madhattan Studios (owned and operated by Ming + FS). His alter ego, The Arch Cupcake, also saw success with the release of Box of Bees featuring "Wasabi" used in a Chrysler commercial and MTV's Making the Band 4.

References

External links 
 
 Patriarch Recordings

American DJs
Dubstep musicians
Living people
Musicians from Brooklyn
Electronic dance music DJs
Year of birth missing (living people)